John Raymond (Jack) Ellis (31 October 1929 – 1 December 1994) was a Canadian politician. He served a term as Mayor of Belleville, Ontario from 1964 to 1967. As a Progressive Conservative, he served five terms as a Member of Parliament in the House of Commons representing the Ontario electoral districts of Hastings and Prince Edward—Hastings.  He was first elected in the 1972 federal election, and was re-elected in the 1974, 1979, 1980, and 1984 elections.

References

External links 
 

Members of the House of Commons of Canada from Ontario
Progressive Conservative Party of Canada MPs
1929 births
1994 deaths
People from Northumberland County, Ontario